Eilema francki is a moth of the subfamily Arctiinae. It was described by Christian Guillermet in 2011. It is found on Réunion.

References

francki
Moths described in 2011
Endemic fauna of Réunion
Moths of Réunion